On Your Shore is Charlotte Martin's first full-length release on a major label.

Track listing
All songs written by Charlotte Martin, except the bonus track "Wild Horses" by The Rolling Stones. String arrangements by David Campbell.
"On Your Shore"
"Limits of Our Love"
"Your Armor"
"Every Time It Rains"
"Steel"
"Sweet Chariot"
"Madman"
"Up All Night"
"Haunted"
"Parade On"
"Something Like a Hero"
"Beautiful Life"
"Wild Horses" (Bonus track)

References

2004 albums
Charlotte Martin albums